Peštan is a river of Serbia and right tributary of the Kolubara river near Vreoci. It belongs to the Black Sea basin.

Geography 

The river originates on the northern slopes of the Bukulja mountain. It was named after its very sandy riverbed (Serbian pesak, "sand").

The villages located on the river include Rudovci, Mali Crljeni, Burovo, Zeoke and Baroševac. Despite not being a major river, and with all the amelioration works in its basin, Peštan remained a seasonally flooding river, especially in spring, damaging agricultural fields and settlements in its watershed.

Mining 

The flooding river also poses constant threat to the Kolubara's surface mines. In 2021, construction of five damn began, with adjoining retention basins. An additional drainage canal, on the southern border of the watershed, will also be built. The planned dams and reservoirs are Bistrica (began in August 2021), Trbušnica (both should be finished by April 2023), Kruševica (starting at early 2022). Rudovci (late 2022) and Darosavica with the drainage canal (2023-2014).

Apart from preventing floods, this will allow the expansion of the mining "Field E", which is estimated to hold 350 million tons of coal.

See also 
List of rivers in Serbia

References

External links 

Rivers of Serbia